James H. Wise (1912 – 1976) was an American politician. He served as a Democratic member of the Florida House of Representatives.

In 1949, Wise was elected to the Florida House of Representatives, serving until 1950. He was elected again in 1957, serving until 1965.

References 

1912 births
1976 deaths
Democratic Party members of the Florida House of Representatives
20th-century American politicians